is a baseball stadium in Fukui, Fukui Prefecture, Japan opened on August 9, 1967.  It is primarily used for baseball and is the home of the Fukui Miracle Elephants.

References

Baseball venues in Japan
Sports venues in Fukui Prefecture
Fukui (city)
Sports venues completed in 1967
1967 establishments in Japan